Scopula alargata is a moth of the family Geometridae. It was described by Paul Dognin in 1901. It is endemic to Ecuador.

References

Moths described in 1901
alargata
Taxa named by Paul Dognin
Endemic fauna of Ecuador
Moths of South America